Rue de Solférino is a street in the Left Bank area of Paris. It was most commonly heard as a reference to the headquarters of the French Socialist Party, which were located there until 2018. The street is named after the Battle of Solferino, fought by Napoleon III and Victor Emmanuel II against Francis Joseph of Austria in 1859.

Access

Socialist Party (France)